Roy Henry Brown (20 December 1923 – November 1989) was an English professional footballer who played as both a centre half and a striker. Brown was the first black player in the history of his first team, Stoke City. Brown also played for Watford, making a total of 212 appearances in the Football League for both clubs. His brother later became Lord Mayor of Stoke-on-Trent.

Career
Brown was born in Stoke-on-Trent and was the son of a Nigerian father, and English mother. He joined Stoke City in 1939 and played for the club during World War II whilst also serving with the army. The Football League resumed in 1946–47 with Brown making history on 28 September 1946 playing in Stoke's 3–1 win over Preston North End he became the club's first black player and he ended the season with four appearances. He was used a back-up utility player by manager Bob McGrory eventually playing regularly in 1950–51 where he played in 29 matches. He scored eight goals in 16 matches during the 1952–53 campaign the second highest as Stoke suffered relegation from the First Division.

Brown now seeking regular first team football left the Victoria Ground in the summer of 1953 for Third Division South side Watford. He spent the first season with the "Hornets" as a centre forward and he scored 21 goals as Watford finished in 4th position. He remained at Vicarage Road for four more seasons before ending his career with non-league Chelmsford City.

Career statistics
Source:

References

1923 births
1989 deaths
English footballers
Stoke City F.C. players
Watford F.C. players
Chelmsford City F.C. players
English Football League players
English people of Nigerian descent
Black British sportsmen
Footballers from Stoke-on-Trent
Association football forwards